A Girl from the Chorus is a 1937 German comedy film directed by Carl Lamac and starring Anny Ondra, Viktor Staal and Ursula Grabley. It is set in the theatre world of Berlin around the turn of the twentieth century.

It was shot at the Babelsberg Studios in Berlin. The film's sets were designed by the art directors Wilhelm Depenau and Karl Vollbrecht.

Cast
Anny Ondra as Henriette Lange
Viktor Staal as Hans Reuter
Ursula Grabley as Liesbeth Grimme
Erika Körner as Vera Schreyvogel
Rudolf Platte as Paul Dettmann
Robert Dorsay as Max
Hans Hermann Schaufuß as Berthold Lange
Egon Brosig as Der 'Truthahn'
Ernst Rotmund as Schröder
Klaus Pohl as Inspizient
Else Lüders as Gardrobiere
Hellmuth Passarge as horse groomer
Luise Werckmeister as owner of Plätt-Stube
Aribert Grimmer as cobbler
Ernst Albert Schaach as waiter

References

External links

Films of Nazi Germany
Films directed by Karel Lamač
German black-and-white films
UFA GmbH films
Films set in Berlin
Films set in the 1900s
1930s historical comedy films
German historical comedy films
1937 comedy films
1930s German films
Films shot at Babelsberg Studios
1930s German-language films